Robert Christopher "Robb" Wells (born March 20, 1971) is a Canadian actor, comedian, and screenwriter best known for portraying Ricky on Trailer Park Boys. He is a co-founder of Swearnet.com and often appears in sketches for the Internet media channel.

Early life
Wells was born in Moncton, New Brunswick and moved to Dartmouth, Nova Scotia when he was eight years old. He graduated from Saint Mary's University in 1993 with a Bachelor of Commerce.

Career
In 2002, Wells appeared with John Paul Tremblay and John Dunsworth in the film Virginia’s Run starring Gabriel Byrne and Joanne Whalley, playing characters similar to their Trailer Park Boys characters. Wells also featured in The Boondock Saints II: All Saints Day. In 2010, Wells reunited with many of his former Trailer Park Boys cast-mates in the new series The Drunk and On Drugs Happy Fun Time Hour. Wells appeared in the film Hobo with a Shotgun, released to theaters on March 25, 2011. During the credits for Hobo with a Shotgun, Wells' name is incorrectly spelled as "Rob Wells". In August 2011, Wells made a cameo appearance in the independent film Jackhammer, shot in Victoria, British Columbia. Wells also appeared as a radical Nova Scotian separatist freedom fighter/terrorist in the FX TV series Archer in its third season in an episode entitled "The Limited." His Trailer Park Boys co-stars Tremblay and Mike Smith also had credited voice-over roles in the episode. Wells also starred in the horror movie Would You Rather in 2012 as Peter. In October 2012, Wells, along with Tremblay and Smith, signed on to return to Trailer Park Boys in a third film that started filming in March 2013 and was released April 18, 2014. On July 4, 2013, it was announced that Wells, Tremblay and Smith had acquired the rights to Trailer Park Boys and confirmed it would return with eighth and ninth seasons to be aired on the internet channel SwearNet.com.

It was announced in 2014 that the seasons 8 and 9 of Trailer Park Boys will be shown on Netflix from September 5, 2014. In 2014, Wells co-starred, co-wrote, and co-produced Swearnet with his Trailer Park Boys colleagues.

Filmography

Film

Television

References

External links 

1971 births
Male actors from New Brunswick
Male actors from Halifax, Nova Scotia
Canadian male film actors
Canadian male television actors
Canadian male comedians
Canadian male voice actors
Living people
People from Dartmouth, Nova Scotia
Writers from Halifax, Nova Scotia
Writers from Moncton
Canadian television writers
Canadian male television writers